Warrenton Presbyterian Church can refer to:

 Warrenton Presbyterian Church (Warrenton, Virginia)
 Warrenton Presbyterian Church (Abbeville, South Carolina)